Strumosa is a genus of gastropods belonging to the family Clausiliidae.

The species of this genus are found in Turkey.

Species:

Strumosa abanti 
Strumosa meridiana 
Strumosa strumosa

References

Clausiliidae